The Men's 100 metre backstroke competition of the 2018 African Swimming Championships was held on 14 September 2018.

Records
Prior to the competition, the existing world and championship records were as follows.

The following new records were set during this competition.

Results

Heats
The heats were started on 14 September at 09:50.

Final
The final was started on 14 September.

References

Men's 100 metre backstroke